Dar Gol-e Seyyed Hasan (also Romanized as Dār Gol-e Seyyed Ḩasan, Dārgol-e Seyyed Ḩasan, and Dārgol Seyyed Ḩasan; also known as Dārgol, Dār Gol-e Seyyed Ḩoseyn, and Dārgul Saiyid Hasan) is a village in Haft Ashiyan Rural District, Kuzaran District, Kermanshah County, Kermanshah Province, Iran. At the 2006 census, its population was 43, in 10 families.

References 

Populated places in Kermanshah County